Brenthia octogemmifera is a species of moth of the family Choreutidae. It is found in the Republic of Congo, Equatorial Guinea and Nigeria.

References

Brenthia
Moths of Africa
Moths described in 1897